USS Echols (APB-37) is a Benewah-class barracks ship of the United States Navy.

Construction and career
The ship was laid down on 11 August 1944, by the Boston Navy Yard and launched on 30 July 1945, sponsored by Miss Dorothy O'Brien. She was commissioned in January 1947.

The ship was put into the inactive in commissioned status as Echols (APB-37) at Atlantic Reserve Fleet, 6th Naval District from January 1947 until 1961, where she was to Norfolk. Echols was later towed to Groton to accommodate submarine crews at the Naval Submarine Base New London.

In 1971, she was re-designated as IX-504.

On 22 December 1955, Echols was struck from the Naval Register.

The ship was sold by Defense Reutilization and Marketing Service, on 12 January 2003. Between April 2005 and August 2006, the ship was sold to Clean Waters of New York and has been in used since then as an indoor shop and floating office.

References

 

 

Benewah-class barracks ships
Echols County, Georgia
Ships built in Boston
1945 ships
Cold War auxiliary ships of the United States
Atlantic Reserve Fleet, Green Cove Springs Group